Mehnga Singh Babbar or Kulwant Singh (1957, in Jagadhri – 1984, in Operation Blue Star) was one of the first members and founders of Babbar Khalsa and supporter of Khalistan Movement. He also commanded a number of Sikhs during the first day of Operation Blue Star.

Early life
Mehnga Singh or Kulwant Singh was born in Jagadhri, Yamunanagar, from Sikh parents. His father's name was Sardar Partap Singh. After passing ninth grade, he entered to ITI and started a course. After the April 1978 massacre, Mehnga Singh started going to Akhand Kirtani Jatha programmes. In 1979, Mehnga Singh baptised Sikh, by drinking Amrit. He held his first attack to Nirankaris in Jagadhri, when some of them held a meeting. He with some companions attacked them and the most of Nirankaris run away. He was charged in Murdery case and he was arrested, but he was later released. After that, he left his hometown and came in Amritsar, to Amarjit Kaur, wife of Fauja Singh, who was killed in action in the massacre of 1978.

Babbar Khalsa activities
In September 1979, he attended a camp where he learned Sikh philosophy and weaponry. There he met Sukhdev Singh Babbar, Kulwant Singh Nagoke, Sulakhan Singh, Balwinder Singh, Vadhava Singh, Anokh Singh Babbar, Manmohan Singh Babbar and others. Together they started the Babbar Khalsa, to take revenge from Nirankaris and others. From then, they started finding from town and cities the anti-Sikhs, and then they killed them. After that, the government started to find who was doing these actions, so the members of Babbar Khalsa started to hiding from the police.

Operation Blue Star and death
On 27–30 April 1984, from the warning of Jarnail Singh Bhindranwale all the companions started to make bunkers in Golden Temple complex. Mehnga Singh along with about 40 men built a big bunker in Baba Atal of heavy machine guns, semi-automatic rifles and Talwar. On 1 June 1984, the first day of the Operation Blue Star, armed forces of CRPF and Border Security Force (BSF) attacked the bunker at 12 pm.
He and the 40 of his men fought in chamkaur di gaddi until when a sniper shot Mehnga Singh three times in the forehead and killed him along with 8 others. The others ran to other bunkers, when the first bunker fell down. It is alleged by his followers that when an man asked him how he was, he answered "Chardi Kala!".
He was cremated close to Manji Sahib, near the Golden Temple.

References 

Indian Sikhs
1957 births
1984 deaths